Ellerslie is a residential neighbourhood in southeast Edmonton, Alberta, Canada. While City of Edmonton documents note that there are diverse stories related to Scottish settlers introducing the name Ellerslie, it is known that the name was applied to the local school district by 1895, and to the local post office in 1896, when it was still a rural area many kilometers south of the early boundaries of the recently (1892) incorporated Town of Edmonton.

The Ellerslie neighbourhood includes the Wernerville country residential area, which is designated a special study area within the Ellerslie Area Structure Plan and is recognized as a locality by Statistics Canada.

The Ellerslie neighbourhood is bounded on the south by Ellerslie Road, on the north by the Anthony Henday Drive corridor, on the east by 66 Street, and on the west by 91 Street. Wernerville comprises the easternmost portion of the neighbourhood. Immediately north of the Anthony Henday Drive is the Mill Woods area of Edmonton and the neighbourhoods of Satoo and Menisa.

The most common type of residence in the neighbourhood is the single family dwelling. According to the 2005 municipal census, two out of every three residences (66%) were single-family dwellings.  Row houses make up another one in five (20%) of residences followed by apartment style condominiums which make up 12% of all residences.  The remaining 2% or residences were duplexes.  Substantially all residences in Ellerslie are owner occupied.

The community is represented by the Ellerslie Community League, established in 1962.

Demographics 

Surrounding neighbourhoods

See also 
 Edmonton Federation of Community Leagues

References

External links 
 Ellerslie Neighbourhood Profile

Neighbourhoods in Edmonton